Gazi Anatolian High School is a co-educational Anatolian High School in Ankara, Turkey. It was founded under the name "Söğütözü Anatolian High School" in 1984.  In 1986 it moved to its current location and adopted the current name. The emblem of the school is the signature of Mustafa Kemal Atatürk, which is worn every Gazi student on their uniform.

According to High School Entrance Examinations in Turkey, Gazi is consistently ranked among the top ten high schools in Turkey (ninth in 2006 and fourth in 2005). Gazi students average in the top percentile of all students taking the Turkish high school entrance exam. Gazi students score outstanding results in Student Selection Exam thus ranking Gazi one of the most successful Anatolian high schools in Turkey.

Gazi is one of the largest primary education institutions in Ankara, with an administrative and classroom building, a gymnasium/sports center, a canteen and a student dormitory on campus.  The primary language of instruction in the school is Turkish but students take obligatory English lessons as a foreign language.

References

External links
 Alumni Organization

High schools in Ankara
Educational institutions established in 1984
1984 establishments in Turkey
Anatolian High Schools